Joachim Chreptowicz pseud.: Jeden z współziomków (4 January 1729, Jasieniec near Navahradak – 4 March 1812), of Odrowąż Coat of Arms, was a Polish-Lithuanian nobleman, writer, poet, politician of the Grand Duchy of Lithuania, marshal of the Lithuanian Tribunal and the last Grand Chancellor of Lithuania. He was a member of the Permanent Council, activist of the Commission of National Education, physiocrat and a vivid supporter of the Targowica Confederation.

Works
 Réponse de la part du Roi aux Députés de la Délégation prononcée par... le 16 févier 1774
 "Zdanie JW. JP. ... na projekt pod tytułem: Powinności i władza departamentów w Radzie, na sesji sejmowej w r. 1776 d. 23 września dane", brak miejsca i roku wydania; także Warszawa 1776 (tu nieco inaczej sformułowano końcową część tytułu: ... na sesji sejmowej dnia 23 września 1776 miane)
 Poezja, wyd. w: I. Krasicki "Zbiór potrzebniejszych wiadomości", Warszawa 1781 i wyd. następne, (artykuł)
 Odpowiedź tegoż, powst. 1787, wyd. w: F. Karpiński Dzieła wierszem i prozą, t. 1, Warszawa 1806, s. 348-350; odpowiedź na list poetycki F. Karpińskiego pt. "List do J. L. C. P. W. Ks. L. (Joachima Litawora Chreptowicza Pisarza Wielkiego Księstwa Litewskiego) z Krasnegostawu; Karpiński napisał w 1787 roku 2 kolejne listy poetyckie do Chreptowicza, ogł. w: Dzieła..., s. 346-348, 350-354
 Głos JW. Jmci Pana... na sesji sejmowej dnia 18 grudnia r. 1789 Odezwa do publiczności, brak miejsca wydania (1794)
 Reprodukcja coroczna krajowa, powst. około roku 1801, wyd. w książce: J. Turgot O składaniu się i podzielaniu majątków w społeczności, tłum. S. Kłokocki, Warszawa 1802
 O prawie natury, pismo oryginalne jednego z współziomków, wyd. S. K. (Kłokocki), Warszawa 1814
 Na obraz Rafaela. Wiersz łaciński (informacja G. Korbuta)
 Magazyn Warszawski (tu: "List do edytora" 1785, t. 1, cz. 1; "Wiadomość względem użytecznego i trwałego poprawiania łąk" 1785, t. 1, cz. 2), Pamiętnik Warszawski'' (1809-1810).

Bibliography
 Historia Dyplomacji Polskiej – tom II 1572-1795, PWN, Warszawa 1981, s. 525
 Krzysztof Tracki, Problem reformy miejskiej w ideach i działalności politycznej podkanclerzego litewskiego Joachima Chreptowicza (w okresie Sejmu Czteroletniego)
 G. Ryżewski, Ród Chreptowiczów herbu Odrowąż, Kraków 2006
 T. 4: Oświecenie. W: Bibliografia Literatury Polskiej – Nowy Korbut. Warszawa: Państwowy Instytut Wydawniczy, 1966, s. 354-357.

External links

1729 births
1812 deaths
People from Navahrudak District
Polish nobility
Polish poets
18th-century Lithuanian nobility
19th-century Lithuanian nobility
Secular senators of the Polish–Lithuanian Commonwealth
Diplomats of the Polish–Lithuanian Commonwealth
People from Nowogródek Voivodeship (1507–1795)
Grand Chancellors of the Grand Duchy of Lithuania
Deputy Chancellors of the Grand Duchy of Lithuania
Recipients of the Order of the White Eagle (Poland)